Baix Empordà in Catalan or Bajo Ampurdán in Spanish is a comarca (county) in the province of Girona, Catalonia, Spain. It is one of the two comarca into which Empordà was divided in the comarcal division of 1936, the other one being Alt Empordà. It is popularly known as L'Empordanet ("the Little Empordà").

Geography

Extent 
Baix Empordà is the southern portion of the historical region of Empordà. It includes the municipalities between the Montgrí Massif, just north of the river Ter, and the Aro valley, in the south. It borders Alt Empordà to the north, Gironès and Selva to the west and the Mediterranean Sea to the east.

The Mediterranean coast of the Baix Empordia is part of the Costa Brava, and is a major tourist destination, including resorts such as Sant Feliu de Guíxols, s'Agaro, Platja d'Aro, Sant Antoni de Calonge, Palamós, La Fosca, Calella de Palafrugell, Llafranc, Tamariu, Fornells de Mar and l'Estartit.

There are 37 municipalities within the comarca.

Municipalities

References

External links

Official comarcal web site (in Catalan)
Tourist comarcal web site 
Miscellaneous related information on the web site of the Generalitat de Catalunya (in Catalan)

 
Comarques of the Province of Girona